Brigadier General Helena Amutenya is a Namibian military officer who is serving as the Director, Defence Legal Services.

Career
Brigadier General Helena Amutenya the military as a recruit in 2007. After basic military training she was appointed as a Senior Legal Officer with the rank of Captain until 2009. She was then appointed Chief Legal Officer in 2009. In 2014, she was promoted to Colonel. In 2018, she was appointed as the head of Defence Legal Services although retaining her Colonel rank. In November 2021, she was promoted to the rank of Brigadier General, becoming only the fourth female general officer in the Namibian Defence Force.

Qualifications
She received her Bachelor of Laws (LLB) from the University of Namibia in 2006
and her Master of Laws (LLM) from Stellenbosch University in 2013.

Honours and decorations
  Army Ten Years Service Medal

References

Living people
Namibian military personnel

1984 births